This is a list of football personalities who have received Orders, decorations, and medals of the United Kingdom. Entries are listed alphabetically under the highest award attained. Previous awards, if gained, are listed in the relevant notes section. As many as 16 football personalities have been knighted so far (excluding honorary knighthoods).
All players from the winning team in the 1966 World Cup Final were awarded the MBE, additionally Jack Charlton, Bobby Moore, Gordon Banks and George Eastham were made OBE.

List of recipients

Individuals who have declined honours
In August 2016, former Liverpool player Howard Gayle, the first black footballer to play for the club, revealed he had turned down an MBE for his work with Show Racism the Red Card, stating that it would be "a betrayal to all of the Africans who have lost their lives, or who have suffered as a result of Empire."

See also
 List of sporting knights and dames
 United Kingdom order of precedence
 List of honorary British Knights
 Post-nominal letters

References

External links
 England Football Online, Royal honours

British honours system
 
 
Honours